12787 / 88 Narasapuram–Nagarsol Express is a Express train belonging to Indian Railways South Central Railway zone that runs between  and Nagarsol in India.

Service 
It operates as train number 12787 from Narasapuram to Nagarsol and as train number 12788 in the reverse direction, serving the states of Andhra Pradesh, Telangana & Maharashtra.

Coaches

The 12787 / 88 Narasapuram–Nagarsol superfast Express has one AC 2-tier, two AC 3-tier, 10 sleeper class, four general unreserved & two SLR (seating with luggage rake) coaches. It doesn't carry a pantry car.

As with most train services in India, coach composition may be amended at the discretion of Indian Railways depending on demand.

Routeing

Traction
As this route is partially electrified, a Gooty-based diesel WDP-4D loco pulls the train from Nagarsol to Secunderabad and then from Secunderabad Lallaguda based WAP-7 to its destination.

References

External links
17213 Narasapuram Nagarsol Express at India Rail Info
17214 Nagarsol Narasapuram Express at India Rail Info

Express trains in India
Rail transport in Andhra Pradesh
Rail transport in Telangana
Rail transport in Maharashtra